Where's My Perry? was a puzzle video game spun-off from the Disney Interactive game Where's My Water?, themed after Phineas and Ferb and featuring Perry the Platypus. It was developed by Creature Feep and published by Disney Mobile, a subsidiary of Disney Interactive Studios. The game was released on June 28, 2012, for Apple iOS systems; on July 18, 2012, for Android-powered devices, and on December 10, 2013, for Windows Phone. It was also available for BlackBerry 10 operating system. The last reported version was 1.5.1 for Apple devices, 1.4.0 for Android, and 1.0.2.0 for Windows Phone. As of February 2021, it is no longer available for unknown reasons. The game contains fully voiced dialogue and cutscenes, with the voice actors from the original series (Dan Povenmire, Jeff "Swampy" Marsh, Tyler Alexander Mann and Dee Bradley Baker) reprising their roles.

Synopsis 
Phineas and Ferb are asleep while they were working at their newest idea, which is an opportunity for Perry the Platypus to successfully sneak into O.W.C.A.'s headquarters. However, Perry (now as Agent P) is stuck at a checkpoint. It is revealed that with progressing through the entrance, it needs to be powered by water. After the final level is finished, it reveals a more comedically mundane outcome of what the stage would have been about, e.g. in "An Agent I Can Trust", Major Monogram asks Agent P if he trusts him with his new mustache, much to Agent P's annoyance.

All of the main levels also require the player to collect gnomes, to unlock the next set. The game has two other game modes; Doofenshmirtz Evil Incorporated, where Doofenshmirtz's levels require "evil" sludge (the game's version of poisonous water), turning various household objects into his mechanized, sentient minions of his likeness. With three other agents – Terry the Turtle, Peter the Panda and Pinky the chihuahua – coming together to fight back, the O.W.C.A. levels combine previous mechanics and introduce Doofenshmirtz's newest Inator, which can change dirt into water and vice versa.

Reception

While 148Apps gave the app an overall rating of 4 stars, the reviewer said "...I can’t help feeling Where’s My Perry? is a little too close to Where’s My Water? to earn top marks. As a sequel it’s more than solid, just download prepared for more of what you know and love, not a new experience." Slide To Play gave it a rating of 3+ (good), saying "Simply put, Where’s My Perry? is a very good game, whether you’re a fan of Where’s My Water? or a fan of Phineas and Ferb. And if you’re a fan of both? Then there is no reason for you not to have this game." Gamezebo gave it 4½ stars.

See also
List of most downloaded Android applications

References

External links
 
 iOS App Store
 BlackBerry World

2012 video games
Android (operating system) games
BlackBerry 10 games
Delisted digital-only games
Disney video games
IOS games
Phineas and Ferb video games
Products and services discontinued in 2021
Video games developed in the United States
Windows Phone games
Single-player video games